Shadow of the Unnamable is a multi award winning short film by German director Sascha Alexander Renninger. It is based on H. P. Lovecraft's short story The Unnamable (1923). It had its premiere in 2011 at the H.P. Lovecraft Film Festival in Los Angeles, California, USA. There it won its first award, Best Short Lovecraft Adaptation.

S.T. Joshi,  Lovecraft scholar and bibliographer said about the film: “Shadow of the Unnamable is a splendid Lovecraftian film. With its convincing period atmosphere, its restrained but powerful special effects, and most of all its hints of cosmic terror, it captures the essence of the Lovecraftian imagination.”

Awards 
Best Sci-Fi / Horror Short, 2013 Berlin Independent Film Festival, Berlin, Germany
Best International Horror Short, 2012 Buffalo Screams Horror Film Festival, Buffalo, NY, USA
Best Short Lovecraft Adaptation, 2011 H.P. Lovecraft Film Festival‭®, Los Angeles, California, USA

Nominations
Best International Horror Short, 2012 Buffalo Screams Horror Film Festival, Buffalo, NY, USA
Best Editing, 2012 Buffalo Screams Horror Film Festival, Buffalo, NY, USA
Best Special Visual Effects, 2012 Buffalo Screams Horror Film Festival, Buffalo, NY, USA

References

External links
 "Shadow of the Unnamable" – Official Website
 
 

Films based on works by H. P. Lovecraft
2011 horror films
2011 films
Films based on short fiction